Giovanni Fontana may refer to:

Giovanni Fontana (engineer) (c. 1395–c. 1455), Venetian physician and engineer who portrayed himself as a magus
Giovanni Fontana (architect) (1540–1614), Dominican friar and late-Mannerist architect, brother of Domenico Fontana
Giovanni Fontana (bishop of Ferrara) (1537–1611), Roman Catholic bishop
Giovanni Fontana (bishop of Cesena) (1697–1716), Roman Catholic bishop
Giovanni Battista Fontana (painter) (1524–1587), Italian painter and engraver
Giovanni Battista Fontana (composer) (c. 1571–1630), Italian Baroque composer and violinist
Giovanni Maria Fontana (c. 1670–after 1712), Italian-Swiss architect who worked in Russia
Giovanni Fontana (sculptor) (1821–1893), Italian-born sculptor, based in London
Giovanni Fontana (poet) (born 1946), Italian poet and publisher